Napa Soda Springs (formerly Jacksons Napa Soda Springs) is a set of natural water springs that was the site of a resort in the 1880's in Napa County, California.
It lies at an elevation of 705 feet (215 m).

The Napa Soda Springs post office operated from 1882 to 1929.

References

Reference bibliography 

Unincorporated communities in Napa County, California
Yountville, California
Unincorporated communities in California